The Gag Island rat or Niken's rat (Rattus nikenii) is a species of rodent in the family Muridae. It is endemic to Gag Island in West Papua, Indonesia.

It was described in 2010 after studies found it to be distinct in anatomy and coloration from other Papuan Rattus species. Although it is only known from Gag Island, it could potentially also be found on other islands in the Raja Ampat chain. 

Although its habitat is protected to an extent, it is threatened by nickel mining on Gag Island; due to this, it is classified as Vulnerable on the IUCN Red List.

References 

Rattus
Endemic fauna of New Guinea
Mammals of Western New Guinea
Rodents of Indonesia
Mammals described in 2010
Rodents of New Guinea